Miodowicz is a Polish surname. Notable people with the surname include: 

Alfred Miodowicz (1929–2021), Polish politician and trade union activist
Konstanty Miodowicz (1951–2013), Polish politician

Polish-language surnames